According to TFF, the 2019 summer transfer window for Turkish football transfers ran run from 17 June to 2 September 2019. Clubs were, however, eligible to use buy options or terminate contracts earlier than the window starts.

On 18 July 2019, TFF announced the 2019–20 season calendar of professional leagues, as follows:

Transactions

Transfers

 
All clubs without a flag are Turkish. Multiple transfer made in one day by a club are listed alphabetically, based on their forename.

Loans

References
Footnotes

Citations

External links
 Turkish Football Federation

Transfers
Turkey
2019